The Yorkshire Engine Company Half Janus is a 0-6-0 wheel arrangement, diesel electric locomotive which weighs 31 long tons with a maximum speed of 23 mph. The Half Janus was built by the Yorkshire Engine Company in Sheffield between 1956 and 1965.

Each locomotive was built (out of the factory) with one Rolls-Royce C6SFL 220 hp (300 kW) engine which was paired with one generator to power the traction motor mounted to the wheel set at the back of the locomotive under the cab.

The locomotive was nicknamed the Half Janus because it had half the power and body of the Yorkshire Engine Company Janus. The Janus locomotive has two bonnets and the Half Janus has one. The Yorkshire engine company Janus got its name from the two-faced god, Janus.

Locomotives in preservation 
There is one example of a Half Janus at the Appleby Frodingham Railway Preservation Society based at the Scunthorpe Steelworks in North Lincolnshire, another at Rocks by Rail and a third at the South Devon Railway.

One example is 'Arnold Machine', which was brought into preservation at the society from Eccles Slag Co LTD. The locomotive served at Scunthorpe Steelworks, Normanby Park Works ran by United Steel Company at the time. 'Arnold Machine' was built with the works number '2661' in 1958. The locomotive is currently being overhauled at the society sheds.

'Arnold Machine' has a twin sister which is now located at Rocks by Rail, Loco '1382'. It is currently preserved in its Colsterworth Mines, United Steel Company Maroon livery. Loco '1382' spent most of its working life at the Colsterworth Mines. When this closed it moved to the Scunthorpe Steelworks Normanby Park Works site until the Normanby Park Works was closed in the 1990s. The locomotive was then preserved at Rocks by Rail. It moved to the Appleby Frodingham Railway Preservation Society in May 2015 to be overhauled. The locomotive then moved to Peak Rail in August 2016, along with two other locomotives owned by Andrew Briddon. After the overhaul was completed in 2019, the locomotive moved back to Rocks by Rail where is regularly operates on open days.

References

YEC locomotives
C locomotives
British Rail diesel locomotives
Industrial diesel locomotives of Great Britain
Standard gauge locomotives of Great Britain